Fugitives, Smugglers, and Thieves: Piracy and Personhood in American Literature is the debut book by Mexican academic Sharada Balachandran Orihuela. It was published by University of North Carolina Press in 2018. It explores piracy and illegal trade in American literature as a form of self-representation by colonial subjects facing abjection due to exclusionary citizenship and property laws.

Content 
Balachandran Orihuela explores piracy and illegal trade in American literature. The exclusionary concepts of citizenship resulting in the social, political, and economic isolation of pirates impacts their "racial, national, and gendered identities." She uses the Two Treatises of Government and Commentaries on the Laws of England as the bases of property ownership. In her book, property is part of a "matrix of rights and claims for citizenship." Balachandran Orihuela posits that certain minorities, slaves, and other colonial subjects disenfranchised by citizenship and property laws turned to piracy and illegal trade as a form of self-representation to combat abjection. Balachandran Orihuela investigated pirates, black slaves in the Antebellum South, Mexicans on the Mexico–United States border before the Mexican–American War, and Confederate blockade runners of the American Civil War.

Reception 
The book received positive literary reviews in Early American Literature and the Journal of American Studies.

Author 
Sharada Balachandran Orihuela, an Indian Mexican, was born in Mexico to Rosamaria Orihuela and Gopalan Balachandran. Her father, an Indian academic, had studied at University of Wisconsin–Madison. She is the granddaughter of civil servant P. V. Gopalan. Balachandran Orihuela started formal education in New Delhi and moved frequently between India, Mexico, and the United States. After moving to Oakland, California for college in 2001, Balachandran Orihuela's aunt, biomedical scientist Shyamala Gopalan, helped her cope with race relations in the aftermath of the September 11 attacks and later influenced her intellectual trajectory. She is the cousin of lawyer Maya Harris and U.S. Vice President Kamala Harris. Balachandran Orihuela completed a Bachelor of Arts in English at Mills College. In 2012, she earned a Ph.D. in English at University of California, Davis. Balachandran Orihuela joined the faculty at University of Maryland, College Park in September 2012. , she is an associate professor of English and comparative literature.

References 

2018 non-fiction books
History books about the American Civil War
University of North Carolina Press books
Piracy in the United States
American history books